The women's football tournament at the 1990 Asian Games was held from 27 September to 6 October 1990 in Beijing, China.

Squads

Results

Goalscorers

References

RSSSF

External links

Women